The Sambhar Salt Lake, India's largest inland salt lake, is located in Sambhar Lake Town, Jaipur district of Rajasthan, India,  southwest of the city of Jaipur and  northeast of Ajmer, Rajasthan. It surrounds the historical Sambhar Lake Town.

Geography 

The lake receives water from six rivers: Mantha, Rupangarh, Khari, Khandela, Medtha and Samod. Lake has 5700 square km catchment area. The lake is an extensive saline wetland, with water depth fluctuating from as few as  during the dry season to about 3 meters (10 ft) at the end of the monsoon season. It occupies an area of 190 to 230 square kilometers based on the season. The lake is elliptically shaped with a length of approximately 35.5 km and a breadth varying between 3  km and 11 km. The lake straddles Nagaur and Jaipur districts and borders on the Ajmer district. The circumference of the lake is 96 km, and it is surrounded by the Aravali hills on all sides.

The Sambhar lake basin is divided by a 5.1 km long dam made of sandstone. After the saltwater reaches a certain concentration, it is released from the west side to the east side by lifting dam gates. To the east of the dam are salt evaporation ponds where salt has been farmed for a thousand years. This eastern area is 80 square km and comprises salt reservoirs, canals and salt pans separated by narrow ridges. To the east of the dam is a railroad, built by the British (before India's independence) to provide access from Sambhar Lake City to the salt works.

The water is fed into the lake from streams from the rivers Mendha, Runpangarh, Khandel, and Karian. The Mendha and Rupangarh are main streams. The Mendha flows from north to south and the Rupangarh flows from south to north.

Economic importance 
Sambhar Salt Lake is India's largest saline lake and is the source of most of Rajasthan's salt production. It produces 196,000 tonnes of clean salt every year, which is around 9% of India's salt production. Salt is produced by evaporation of brine and is mostly managed by the government-owned company - Sambhar Salts Ltd.(SSL), a joint venture of the Hindustan Salts Ltd. and the state government. SSL owns 3% of the eastern lake.

The company is struggling to produce sufficient amount of salt but the private players are producing more than 10 times that of the company due to production from thousands of illegal borewells, which are also severely harming the ecology of the salt lake. (see Environmental concerns section)

There are 38 clusters of villages surrounding the lake. Major settlements include Sambhar, Gudha, Jabdinagar, Nawa, Jhak, Korsina, Jhapok, Kanseda, Kuni, Tyoda, Govindi, Nandha, Sinodiya, Arwik ki dhani, Khanadja, Khakharki, Kerwa ki dhani, Rajas, Jalwali ki dhani.

In 2014, six PSUs including Bharat Heavy Electricals Limited and Power Grid Corporation of India Ltd had planned to set up the world's largest 4,000 MW Ultra-mega Solar power project in the land under the company. But after BJP government came to power in the state, the project was scrapped, citing environmental issues and shifted to Gujarat.

In 2019, the Rajasthan government started an asset-liability assessment to take over loss-making Sambhar Salts Ltd. from Hindustan Salts Ltd.

Ecological importance 
Sambhar has been designated as a Ramsar site (recognized wetland of international importance) because the wetland is a key wintering area for tens of thousands of pink flamingos and other birds that migrate from northern Asia and Siberia. The specialized algae and bacteria growing in the lake provide striking water colours and support the lake ecology that, in turn, sustains the migrating waterfowl. There is other wildlife in the nearby forests, where Nilgai move freely along with deer and foxes. (see Environmental concerns section)

In November 2019, nearly 20,000 of migratory birds were found dead mysteriously in the lake area.

The salt (NaCl) concentration in this lake water differs from season to season. The salt concentration in the pans (kyars) varies and, accordingly, the color of the brine ranges from green, orange, pink, purple, pink and red due to the bloom of haloalkaliphilic microorganisms. The first haloalkaliphilic archaeon isolated from this lake was Natrilaba SSL1 (earlier designated as Natronobacterium SSL1 ATCC 43988 by Upasani and Desai (1990). More recently, haloalkaliphilic microalgae namely Dunaliella, Euhalothece, Nitzchia, etc. have also been isolated (Bhatt H. H.and Upasani V. N., 2016). The archaeal isolates can be a source of haloalkaliphilic enzymes for biotechnological applications.

History and tourism 
The Indian epic Mahabharata mentions the Sambhar Lake as a part of the kingdom of the demon king Vrishparva, as the place where his priest Shukracharya lived, and as the place where the wedding between his daughter, Devayani, and King Yayati took place. A temple near the lake is dedicated to Devayani.

The legend has it that Shakambhari Devi, the tutelary goddess of Chauhan Rajputs (Prithviraj Chauhan) and the consort of Lord Shiva, converted a dense forest into a plain of silver as payment for some service. Subsequently, at the request of the inhabitants who dreaded the greed and strife that such a possession would beget, she transformed the silver plain into a lake. The name of the lake, Sambhar, stems from a variation Shakambhari, which happened around the sixth century. Another temple near the lakeshore is dedicated to Shakambhari Devi.

In 1884, ancient sculpture art was discovered in the area as part of small-scale excavation work done in Sambhar Lake. During that excavation, some terracotta structures, coins, and seals were found along with a clay stupa. Sambhar sculpture art appears to be influenced by Buddhism. Later on, around 1934, a large-scale systematic and scientific excavation was conducted in which a large number of terracotta figurines, stoneware, and decorated discs were found. A number of these sculptures from Sambhar are present at the Albert Hall Museum.

Tourism and filming destination

 Sambhar Mahotsav 

For the film Delhi-6 directed by Rakeysh Omprakash Mehra, production designer Samir Chanda recreated inner lanes of Old Delhi at Sambhar. Later for certain scenes, historic Jama Masjid was digitally added to the frame as a backdrop. Certain scenes of many other popular films have been shot around the lake and the main Sambhar Lake Town such as:

Delhi-6
Veer
Gulaal
Highway
Drona
Zila Ghaziabad
PK
Tevar
Goliyon Ki Raasleela Ram-Leela
Super 30
Bard of Blood

Songs shot:

 DJ Wale Babu, "She move it like" - Badshah
 "Car Me Music Baja" - Neha Kakkar
 "Mar Gaye Meet Gaye Lut Gaye" - Hans Raj Hans
 "Lahore, Surma Surma" - Guru Randhawa

On the 68th Republic Day of the India, Nissan GT-R set a world record in Limca Book of Records by making the largest outline of the map of India. It recreated the approximate outline of Indian map spanning 3 km in length and 2.8 km in width with a total outline periphery of 14.7 km at Sambhar Lake.

Transport 

The nearest airports are Jaipur International Airport and Kishangarh Airport

Commute through public transport: Sambhar Lake Town railway station, Phulera Junction railway station and RSRTC bus stand.

Environmental concerns 

 Rajasthan government confirms botulism killed thousands of birds at Sambhar Lake in Jaipur - INDIA TODAY; https://www.indiatoday.in/india/story/rajasthan-government-confirms-botulism-killed-thousands-birds-sambhar-lake-jaipur-1621522-2019-11-22
 सांभरझील और उसके संरक्षण से जुड़े कुछ पहलु by Dau Lal Bohra. https://rajasthanbiodiversity.org/sambhar-lake-salt-extraction-migratory-birds/
Ideas for Cause Pile up but Mystery of Avian Horror at Sambhar Lake Persists https://thewire.in/environment/sambhar-lake-bird-death-avian-influenza-botulism-salt-mining-electrocution
 सांभर झील पर सुबह उड़ा ड्रोन, पक्षियों की तलाश शुरू - राजस्थान पत्रिका https://www.patrika.com/jaipur-news/drones-flew-on-sambhar-lake-in-the-morning-birds-started-searching-5401454/
 Sambhar Lake: 18 हजार पक्षियों की मौत के बाद सांभर झील से नमक सप्लाई पर रोक, एनजीटी ने मांगी रिपोर्ट - दैनिक जागरण; https://www.jagran.com/rajasthan/jaipur-ban-on-salt-supply-from-sambhar-lake-after-the-death-of-18-thousand-birds-19779644.html
 Sambhar lake, the death bed for thousands of birds - THE FREE PRESS JOURNAL; https://www.freepressjournal.in/india/sambhar-lake-the-death-bed-for-thousands-of-birds
 राजस्थान की सांभर झील बनी कब्रगाह, 18 हजार पक्षियों की मौत - दैनिक जागरण; https://www.jagran.com/rajasthan/jaipur-18-thousand-birds-found-dead-in-sambhar-lake-of-rajasthan-19771398.html
Management, hydrology, salt pans — What's behind Rajasthan's bird crisis? - THE INDIAN EXPRESS; https://indianexpress.com/article/explained/sambhar-lake-rajasthan-bird-deaths-in-india-6129271/
 Illegal salt mining under scanner for mass death of birds at Rajasthan's Sambhar Lake - THE PRINT; https://theprint.in/environment/illegal-salt-mining-under-scanner-for-mass-death-of-birds-at-rajasthans-sambhar-lake/321869/
 Avian botulism: Deadly disease kills thousands of birds in Rajasthan's Sambhar Lake - THE HINDU; https://www.thehindu.com/sci-tech/energy-and-environment/avian-botulism-kills-thousands-of-birds-in-rajasthans-sambhar-lake/article30049110.ece
 Cancel illegal salt pans in Sambhar Lake: NGT bench to Rajasthan government - INDIAN EXPRESS; https://indianexpress.com/article/india/cancel-illegal-salt-pans-in-sambhar-lakengt-bench-to-raj-govt-4422187/
 Thousands of migratory birds die mysteriously in Rajasthan's Sambhar Lake; https://www.thehindu.com/news/national/other-states/thousands-of-migratory-birds-die-mysteriously-in-rajasthans-sambhar-lake/article29950537.ece/amp/
 Migratory birds retreat from a 'shrinking' Sambhar Lake : study - TIMES OF INDIA; https://timesofindia.indiatimes.com/city/jaipur/migratory-birds-retreat-from-a-shrinking-sambhar-lake-study/articleshow/67506709.cms
 Public Interest Litigation (PIL) No. 108 of 2013 filed by Naresh Kadyan at the SUPREME COURT of INDIA about bore well mafia, illegal encroachments around Sambhar lake - Wetland of Rajasthan - SCRIBD.COM; https://www.scribd.com/doc/128383352/PIL-for-Sambhar-lake-moved-by-Naresh-Kadyan-before-Supreme-Court-of-India
 Choked on salt - DOWN TO EARTH; https://www.downtoearth.org.in/news/choked-on-salt-41030ref=true
 Sambhar - a lake no more; TIMES OF INDIA https://timesofindia.indiatimes.com/city/jaipur/sambhar-a-lake-no-more/articleshow/62552440.cms
 Sambhar lake - INDIA's largest inland source inland salt being slowly killed; INDIA TODAY; https://www.indiatoday.in/magazine/environment/story/19990308-sambhar-lake-indias-largest-inland-source-of-salt-being-slowly-killed-780335-1999-03-08
 Is it worth the salt ? - EXCAVATE.COM; https://www.excavate.in/indiawaterportal-is-it-worth-the-salt/
 सांभर का नमक मांग रहा अब अपना हक - पत्रिका; https://www.patrika.com/bagru-1/sambhar-demanding-right-of-salt-production-in-rajasthan-election-3778155/
 Private players illegally edge out government-owned Sambhar Salts in salt production - ECONOMIC TIMES; https://economictimes.indiatimes.com/news/economy/finance/private-players-illegally-edge-out-government-owned-sambhar-salts-in-salt-production/articleshow/50909841.cms
 A salty sore: the dying sambhar lake - INDIA WATERPORTAL; https://www.indiawaterportal.org/news/salty-sore-dying-sambhar-lake
Reality check: Sambhar Lake may cease to exist in few years - DNA ; https://www.dnaindia.com/jaipur/report-reality-check-sambhar-lake-may-cease-to-exist-in-few-years-2609744
 Ban On Pan-well Making At Sambhar Lake -  THE INDIAN SALT MANUFACTURERS ASSOCIATION ; http://www.indiansaltisma.com/news-detail/7/ban-on-pan-well-making-at-sambhar-lake
 Arrival of Lesser Flamingos declines at Sambhar Lake - THE HINDU ; https://www.thehindu.com/news/national/arrival-of-lesser-flamingos-declines-at-sambhar-lake/article6797259.ece
  5.10  MiB

References

External links

Lakes of Rajasthan
Ramsar sites in India
Saline lakes of Asia
Jaipur district
Wetlands of India
Salt industry in India